= Yann Dall'Aglio =

- Occupations: Philosopher, Professor, Writer
- Known for: Defining Love
- Notable work: Une Rolex à 50 ans

Yann Dall'Aglio is a French philosopher and author, of Italian origin. He was also a speaker at TEDxParis 2012.

Yann writes about love in the modern era and he defines love as the desire to being desired.

== Works ==
- Une Rolex à 50 ans - A-t-on le droit de rater sa vie ? (2011)
- JTM - L’amour est-il has been ? (2012)
- Vies, sentences et doctrines des sages (2014)
